Malahat-Juan de Fuca was a provincial electoral district for the Legislative Assembly of British Columbia, Canada from 1991 to 2009.

Demographics

Geography

History

Member of Legislative Assembly 

Its MLA is John Horgan. He was first elected in 2005. He represents the New Democratic Party of British Columbia.

Election results 

 
|NDP
|Rick Kasper
|align="right"|8,579
|align="right"|44.18%
|align="right"|
|align="right"|$50,715

|-
|bgcolor="red"|    
|Human Race
|Louis J. Lesosky
|align="right"|68
|align="right"|0.35%
|align="right"|
|align="right"|$12

|}

 
|NDP
|Rick Kasper
|align="right"|10,686
|align="right"|48.63%
|align="right"|
|align="right"|$40,758

|Independent
|Louis James Lesosky
|align="right"|98
|align="right"|0.45%
|align="right"|
|align="right"|$124

|}

|Independent
|Rick Kasper
|align="right"|5,164
|align="right"|22.56%
|align="right"|
|align="right"|$31,524
 
|NDP
|Richard Hughes
|align="right"|3,687
|align="right"|16.10%
|align="right"|
|align="right"|$34,924

|}

External links 
BC Stats Profile - 2001 (pdf)
Results of 2001 election (pdf)
2001 Expenditures (pdf)
Results of 1996 election
1996 Expenditures (pdf)
Results of 1991 election
1991 Expenditures
Website of the Legislative Assembly of British Columbia

Former provincial electoral districts of British Columbia on Vancouver Island